Austin-Emile Burke (January 22, 1922 – August 12, 2011) was a Canadian Prelate of the Catholic Church.

Austin-Emile Burke was born in Sluice Point, Nova Scotia, and ordained a priest on March 25, 1950.  Burke was appointed bishop of the Diocese of Yarmouth on February 1, 1968, and consecrated on May 14, 1968. Burke was appointed archbishop of the Archdiocese of Halifax on July 8, 1991, and installed September 19, 1991. Burke retired on January 13, 1998.

See also
Archdiocese of Halifax
Diocese of Yarmouth

External links
Catholic-Hierarchy
Halifax Archdiocese
Diocese of Yarmouth

20th-century Roman Catholic bishops in Canada
21st-century Roman Catholic bishops in Canada
1922 births
2011 deaths
Roman Catholic archbishops of Halifax